"Incredible" is a song by Canadian singer Celine Dion and American singer-songwriter and record producer, Ne-Yo. It was recorded for Dion's English-language studio album, Loved Me Back to Life (2013) and chosen as the second single in North America, most countries in Europe, Australia and New Zealand. The song was co-written by Andrew Goldstein, Emanuel Kiriakou and Ne-Yo, and produced by Kiriakou.

In mid-December 2013, "Incredible" was nominated in category World's Best Song at the World Music Awards and in late January 2014, it was chosen by NBC as the official anthem of 2014 Winter Olympics. The digital single with two rare bonus tracks was released in most countries in Europe, and in Australia and New Zealand on 14 February 2014. The song was sent to Adult Contemporary radio stations in the United States on 24 February 2014, and the music video for "Incredible" was released on 4 June 2014. "Incredible" was also added to BBC Radio 2's B-List on 12 July 2014 and released as the fourth promotional single in the United Kingdom.

Background and release
Dion and Ne-Yo (who wrote songs for Beyoncé Knowles, Rihanna and many other notable artists) first worked together in 2007. Ne-Yo co-wrote and co-produced "I Got Nothin' Left" for Dion's album Taking Chances, released in November 2007. In September 2012, her official website announced that Dion and Ne-Yo recorded a duet for her upcoming English-language album. Ne-Yo confirmed it in March 2013. Describing the experience as "surreal" to Digital Spy, he said, "The first time I worked for her I wrote a song for her, which in itself was surreal… This time around I actually did a duet with her - it's her and me on one song, which was a challenge to say the least! I was trying to figure what I was even doing there - why would they need my voice when they have hers?". He added, "She wanted to do the song as a duet and I was flattered, but it definitely made me question my vocal ability". In August 2013, Billboard wrote that the song is titled "Incredible". Ne-Yo also wrote and co-produced another song for Loved Me Back to Life titled "Thank You". "Incredible" was co-written by Emanuel Kiriakou and Andrew Goldstein. Kiriakou also first worked with Dion in 2007. He co-produced "Surprise Surprise" recorded for Taking Chances and produced "There Comes a Time" which was included on My Love: Essential Collection (2008). On Loved Me Back to Life he also produced "Thankful" and co-produced "Save Your Soul" together with Goldstein and Danny Mercer.

On 24 October 2013, the behind-the-scenes footage of "Incredible" premiered on Access Hollywood and the next day, the video titled "Making of Incredible" was posted on Dion's Vevo channel. On 29 October 2013, few days before the release of the album, the official audio of "Incredible" was released on Vevo as well. On 7 November 2013, Ne-Yo announced on his Twitter that "Incredible" is the next single from Loved Me Back to Life. Dion's official website confirmed it on 13 December 2013, saying that this song is the new North American single. On the same day, "Incredible" was officially sent to Contemporary hit radio in Italy. On 2 January 2014, it was also sent to radio in Indonesia. On 14 February 2014, "Incredible" was released as a digital single in most countries in Europe (except France and the UK), in Australia and New Zealand. It includes two rare bonus tracks: "Open Arms" from the Japanese edition of Loved Me Back to Life and a remix of "Loved Me Back to Life" by David Morales. "Incredible" was also sent to Adult Contemporary radio stations in the United States on 24 February 2014 and the UK radio on 12 July 2014. The commercial singe was scheduled for release in the UK on 28 July 2014 but it was withdrawn at the last minute.

Critical reception
"Incredible" received positive reviews from music critics. Andrew Hampp from Billboard wrote that the song sounds "so massive the Olympic Committee should start bookmarking it for the 2014 Winter Games". AllMusic editor Stephen Thomas Erlewine highlighted "Incredible" and called it "soulful," "modern" and "subtle" with "palpable R&B undercurrent". Gary Graff of The Oakland Press called this song a "winner". Caroline Sullivan from The Guardian wrote that this duet with Ne-Yo has Dion "reverting to type with a trite ballad that vows their love will 'go down in history' but 'their voices do meld soulfully.'" Elysa Gardner of USA Today called it "slick". Slant Magazine's Eric Henderson noted that "Incredible" is a "power ballad that finds Dion trading lines with Ne-Yo, both singers sounding shockingly interchangeable thanks to the heavy vocal post-production".

Commercial performance
On 13 November 2013, thanks to digital downloads, "Incredible" debuted on the Canadian Hot 100 at number forty-four and number twenty-two on the Hot Canadian Digital Songs chart. In the second week, the single fell to number seventy-eight on the Canadian Hot 100 and in the third week, it went down to number eighty-eight. Thanks to Dion and Ne-Yo's performance of "Incredible" on two US television shows in mid-December 2013, The Voice and A Home for the Holidays, the song re-entered the Canadian Hot 100 at number eighty-one on 25 December 2013. On 27 November 2013, "Incredible" also debuted on the Canadian Adult Contemporary chart at number thirty-seven, beating "Loved Me Back to Life" which peaked there at number thirty-nine. In the next week, it jumped to number thirty-three. Eventually, "Incredible" peaked on the Canadian Adult Contemporary chart at number twenty-four on 15 January 2014.

In the United States, the song entered Billboards Pop Digital Songs chart at number twenty-four on 25 December 2013. After it was sent to Adult Contemporary radio stations in February 2014, "Incredible" debuted at number twenty-eight on the Billboards Adult Contemporary on 20 March 2014, becoming Dion's forty-first entry on this chart. It peaked at number twenty-five on 24 April 2014. On the South Korea's Gaon Music Chart, "Incredible" debuted on 14 November 2013 and peaked at number twelve in the second week.

Live performances
On 3 November 2013, Dion and Ne-Yo performed "Incredible" on Le Banquier in Canada to promote the album which was released two days later. They also performed it in the United States on 17 December 2013 during the grand finale of The Voice and on 18 December 2013 during the CBS 15th annual A Home for the Holidays television special that celebrates the joy of adoption by sharing stories of adoption from foster care in order to raise awareness for the cause. On 31 December 2013, Ne-Yo surprised Dion when he showed up to perform "Incredible" at the New Year's Eve performance of Celine in Las Vegas. On 25 February 2014, Dion officially added "Incredible" to the set list of Celine.

Music video
On 24 January 2014, Dion and Ne-Yo shot the music video for "Incredible" in Los Angeles. It premiered over four months later, on 4 June 2014 on Good Morning America. On 5 June 2014, the video was uploaded onto Dion's official Vevo channel. It was directed by Zach Merck. The music video features Dion and Ne-Yo singing on a rooftop, overlooking Los Angeles interspersed with footage of real-life people showing off their incredible talents as well as a misplaced giraffe on the loose wandering around the city.

Track listing and formatsDigital single'
"Incredible" (duet with Ne-Yo) – 3:55
"Open Arms" – 3:08
"Loved Me Back to Life" (La Vie in Stereo Radio Edit - David Morales) – 4:00

Charts

Credits and personnel
Recording
Recorded at Chalice Recording Studios, Los Angeles, California and Studio at the Palms, Las Vegas, Nevada
Vocals recorded at Studio at the Palms, Las Vegas, Nevada
Mixed at MixStar Studios, Virginia Beach, Virginia

Personnel

Songwriting – Andrew Goldstein, Emanuel Kiriakou, Ne-Yo
Production – Kiriakou
Recording engineers – Kiriakou, Goldstein, Moses Gallart
Vocals recording – François Lalonde
Vocals recording assistant – Mark Everton Gray
Digital editing – Pat Thrall, Jens Koerkemeier
Mixing – Serban Ghenea
Mixing engineer – John Hanes 
Mixing engineer assistant – Phil Seaford
Lead and background vocals – Celine Dion, Ne-Yo 
Keyboards and programming – Kiriakou, Goldstein

Release history

References

2010s ballads
2013 songs
2014 singles
Celine Dion songs
Columbia Records singles
Contemporary R&B ballads
Ne-Yo songs
Pop ballads
Song recordings produced by Emanuel Kiriakou
Songs written by Andrew Goldstein (musician)
Songs written by Emanuel Kiriakou
Songs written by Ne-Yo